Among the memorials to and namesakes of Warren G. Harding, the 29th president of the United States, are the following:

Memorials

 Harding Memorial, Marion, Ohio, listed on the National Register of Historic Places, is the president's burial site
 Peace Treaty Marker in Somerville, New Jersey. In 1921, at the estate of New Jersey Governor Joseph S. Frelinghuysen, Warren Harding signed the peace treaty that ended America's involvement in World War I. Today, the estate has been replaced with mini-malls. The marker remains in a patch of grass near a Burger King parking lot along Route 28, just north of the Somerville traffic circle.
 Harding Memorial, Seattle, Washington. In 1925, a memorial was erected in Seattle at Woodland Park to commemorate the site of Harding's next-to-last public address on July 27, 1923. In 1977, the memorial was demolished and buried under the Woodland Park Zoo's African Savanna exhibit. The memorial's only surviving elements—two life-sized bronze statues of Boy Scouts that once saluted the image of Harding—were donated to the Chief Seattle Council of the Boy Scouts of America. One stands at the Boy Scouts headquarters in Seattle; the other at Camp Parsons, a Boy Scouts camp in Brinnon, Jefferson County, Washington.

Schools

 Warren G. Harding High School, Warren, Ohio
 Warren G. Harding Middle School, Steubenville, Ohio
 Warren G. Harding High School; Bridgeport, Connecticut
 Warren G. Harding Middle School, Philadelphia, Pennsylvania
 Harding Senior High School, Saint Paul, Minnesota
 Harding Middle School, Cedar Rapids, Iowa
 Harding Elementary School, Santa Barbara, California
 Harding Elementary School, El Cerrito, California
 Warren G. Harding Elementary School, Hammond, Indiana
 Marion Harding High School, Marion, Ohio
 Ohio Northern University's College of Law was once named after him but was later renamed.
 Harding Charter Preparatory High School, Oklahoma City, Oklahoma
 Harding Fine Arts Academy, Oklahoma City, Oklahoma
 Harding Elementary in Kenilworth, New Jersey
 Harding Middle School in Des Moines, Iowa

Places 

Harding County, New Mexico
 Harding Park Golf Club in San Francisco
 Warren G. Harding Masonic Lodge in Poulsbo, Washington.
 Montana Highway 2 over Pipestone Pass near Butte, Montana is named "The Harding Way" in his honor.
 Harding Icefield in Southcentral Alaska
 Mount Harding near Skagway, Alaska
 Harding Mountain in Washington state
 Harding Township, New Jersey, Named in 1922 for the incumbent President.
 In a neighborhood of Ketchikan, Alaska, north of the original townsite (or present-day downtown), three adjoining streets were named Warren, G and Harding following Harding's visit to the city.

Other 

 The railroad car in which Harding toured Alaska's "Westward" is on display at Pioneer Park in Fairbanks, Alaska, directly inside the main entrance to the park. The car is also listed on the National Register of Historic Places.
 The railroad car that returned Harding's body to Washington, The Superb, is on display at the Southeastern Railway Museum and, as of 2013, is undergoing restoration for public viewing. The car is also listed on the National Register of Historic Places.

See also
 Presidential memorials in the United States

References

Warren G. Harding 
Harding, Warren G.